Washington v. Recuenco, 548 U.S. 212 (2006), is the United States Supreme Court case of Recuenco, a man who was convicted of second-degree assault after he threatened his wife with a handgun, and subsequently  sentenced by the Washington Supreme Court based not only on the conviction, but based on Recuenco's use of a handgun, charged as assault with a deadly weapon. His sentencing included a three-year enhancement, a standard based on his being armed with a firearm, which is greater than the one-year enhancement he would have received for assault with a deadly weapon. As the jury in the case had not found that Recuenco was armed with a firearm, he argued that the sentencing enhancement violated his Sixth Amendment right to a jury trial. 

At the Supreme Court, the State conceded that a Blakely error had occurred, but argued that the error was harmless beyond a reasonable doubt.  The Court held in a 7-2 opinion that a Blakely error could be considered harmless.

References

External links 
 

United States Supreme Court cases
United States Supreme Court cases of the Roberts Court
United States Sixth Amendment sentencing case law
2006 in United States case law